Catapodium marinum, the sea fern grass, is a species of annual herb in the family Poaceae (True grasses). They have a self-supporting growth form and simple, broad leaves. Individuals can grow to 22 cm tall.

Sources

References 

marinum
Flora of Malta